Zakan may refer to:

Zakan Jugelia (d. 2009), Abkhazian politician
Zakan, Hamadan, a village in Iran
Zakan, Qazvin, a village in Iran